The North Sea Variation (or Norwegian Defence) is an opening variation in chess. It is a line in the Modern Defense complex that occurs after the moves:

1. e4 g6
2. d4 Nf6
3. e5 Nh5

Discussion
According to Jim Bickford, one of the characteristics of this defense is the "cork-screw" maneuver the knight makes by traveling to the second rank via f6 and h5. In the introduction to his monograph, Bickford quotes the late Tony Miles as saying "The black knights are better on the second rank – a shame it takes two moves for them to get there."  This joke is a reference to the fact that black knights on the second rank would likely occupy the squares d7 or e7; however, in the uncommon openings favored by Miles they tend to wind up on less characteristic squares along that rank, such as f7, g7, c7 and b7.

Sideline gambit 
Norwegian Defence, Norwegian Gambit: 1.e4 g6 2.d4 Nf6 3.e5 Nh5 4.Be2 d6, most famously played by Magnus Carlsen against Michael Adams at the 2010 Khanty-Mansiysk Olympiad.

See also
 List of chess openings
 List of chess openings named after places

References

External links 
The Modern, North Sea Variation on Brooklyn64
Review of Jim Bickford's book

Chess openings